Djibouti–Japan relations are bilateral relations between Djibouti and Japan. Djibouti has an embassy in Tokyo whilst Japan has an embassy in Djibouti City.

History
On 27 June 1977, Japan recognized Djibouti as a sovereign state. Diplomatic ties between Djibouti and Japan were established in 1978. The Djiboutian government established an embassy in Tokyo.

State visits
President of Djibouti Hassan Gouled Aptidon made state visits to Japan in 1995 and 1998. Aptidon later made a second visit to Japan in 1998 for TICAD-II. President Ismail Omar Guelleh also made a state visit to Japan in September 2003 and 19–22 December 2010.

Military ties
Japan's Maritime Self-Defense Force (MSDF) has maintained an overseas military base in Djibouti since 2011. Japanese forces in Djibouti are tasked with escorting ships and combating piracy in the Gulf of Aden and the Red Sea. The MSDF has been operating in Djibouti since 2009, when they shared facilities with American forces at Camp Lemonnier, until the establishment of their own base in 2011.

See also 
 Foreign relations of Japan
 Foreign relations of Djibouti

References

External links 
 Embassy of the Republic of Djibouti in Japan
 Embassy of Japan in Djibouti 

 
Bilateral relations of Japan
Japan